Angaria turpini is a species of sea snail, a marine gastropod mollusk in the family Angariidae.

Description

Distribution 
This marine species occurs off New Caledonia.

See also 
 Angaria (gastropod)

References 

 Monsecour K. & Monsecour D. (2006) The genus Angaria Röding, 1798 (Gastropoda: Turbinidae) in New Caledonia, with description of a new species. Visaya 1(6): 9–16.

Angariidae
Gastropods described in 2006